Sky Track Cycling was a professional track cycling team competing in the UCI Track Cycling World Cup Classics series. The team, based at the Manchester Velodrome, was made up of British riders, including Olympic Gold medalists Chris Hoy, Jason Kenny, Victoria Pendleton and Jamie Staff. It was managed by Shane Sutton with  Dave Brailsford acting as team representative.

The team was launched in October 2008 with Hoy, Kenny, Pendleton, Staff, Ross Edgar and Shanaze Reade. In the 2009 track cycling off-season, Reade was replaced by Peter Mitchell and Chris Newton. For the 2010–2011 season, Newton and Staff retired, Mitchell left the team, Reade made a return and Matthew Crampton joined the team. The team remained unchanged for the 2011–2012 season.

The team was not registered with the UCI for the 2013–14 track cycling season.

Major achievements

References

Cycling teams based in the United Kingdom
Track cycling teams
Cycling teams established in 2008
2008 establishments in the United Kingdom
Cycling teams disestablished in 2013
2013 disestablishments in the United Kingdom
Defunct cycling teams based in the United Kingdom